The Nest is the bestselling debut novel by Cynthia D'Aprix Sweeney, published on March 22, 2016. The book debuted on the New York Times best seller list at #3 in Hardcover Fiction for April 10, 2016, and rose to #2 the following week, when it also debuted at #3 on the combined print and e-book list.

Plot and main characters
Leo, Melody, Jack and Bea are four siblings of the Plumb family who live in and around New York. They are due to receive money from a trust fund, which they call the "Nest", when Melody, the youngest, turns 40. However, Leo's reckless actions at a wedding party means that funds need to be withdrawn from the Nest prematurely. This causes tension between the four siblings.

Leo, former director of a popular magazine and website
Jack, antiques dealer and husband to Walker; Jack is secretly in debt
Bea, a writer associated with the "Glitterary Girls" set
Melody, helicopter parent mother to twin daughters who are preparing for college admissions

Reception
The literary imprint Ecco obtained world English rights to the book for a seven-figure deal.

According to Los Angeles Times, "The Nest is an addictive, poignant read with an enticing premise: four adult siblings fighting over the trust fund they're all counting on to bail them out of their particular disappointments and self-inflicted disasters." The Washington Post slated the book as "a comedy of filial greed and affection." The New York Times reported "Ms. Sweeney writes like a pro when it comes to moving her chess pieces around a crowded board."

References

2016 American novels
Novels set in New York City
American LGBT novels
Ecco Press books
2016 debut novels